The fifth season of the American serial drama television series Lost commenced airing on the ABC network in the United States and on A in Canada in January 2009, and concluded with a two-hour season finale on May 13, 2009. The season continues the stories of the survivors of the crash of the fictional Oceanic Airlines Flight 815, after some of them are rescued and those still stranded seemingly disappear to an unknown location and time with the island that they inhabit.

According to Lost co-creator/executive producer/writer/show runner Damon Lindelof, the season "is about why [the people who have left the island] need to get back". Lost returned on January 21, 2009, on ABC with a three-hour premiere consisting of a clip-show and two back-to-back new episodes. The remainder of the season aired on Wednesdays at 9:00 pm EST. The season began in the UK and Ireland on January 25, 2009, on Sky1 and RTÉ Two, respectively. The season was released on DVD and Blu-ray Disc under the title Lost: The Complete Fifth Season – The Journey Back, Expanded Edition on December 8, 2009.

Crew
The season was produced by Bad Robot Productions and Grass Skirt Productions and was aired on the American Broadcasting Company network in the United States. The show was primarily filmed in Hawaii with post-production in Los Angeles. Damon Lindelof and Carlton Cuse continued to serve as the show runners. Lindelof and Cuse's fellow executive producers were co-creator J. J. Abrams, Bryan Burk, Jack Bender, Edward Kitsis and Adam Horowitz. The staff writers were Lindelof, Cuse, Kitsis, Horowitz, co-executive producer Elizabeth Sarnoff, supervising producer Paul Zbyszewski, producer Brian K. Vaughan, co-producer Melinda Hsu Taylor and Kyle Pennington. The regular directors are Bender, co-executive producer Stephen Williams and Paul Edwards.

Cast
The cast features 14 major roles with star billing, all of whom return from the fourth season. Because the storyline follows two different time periods, the cast is largely broken into two groups. The first storyline follows the group of people who have left the island: the survivors' leader Dr. Jack Shephard (Matthew Fox), ex-fugitive Kate Austen (Evangeline Lilly), mentally unstable millionaire Hugo "Hurley" Reyes (Jorge Garcia), former torturer Sayid Jarrah (Naveen Andrews), grieving wife Sun-Hwa Kwon (Yunjin Kim), three-year islander Desmond Hume (Henry Ian Cusick) and Ben Linus (Michael Emerson), former leader of the island's native population, known as the Others. The second follows those who remain on the island as they erratically jump through time, following the island being moved in the fourth-season finale. They are crash survivor and con man James "Sawyer" Ford (Josh Holloway), former Other and fertility specialist Dr. Juliet Burke (Elizabeth Mitchell), crash survivor and former enforcer Jin Kwon (Daniel Dae Kim), who survived the explosion of the freighter, and three members of a science team from a freighter offshore, who have joined the crash survivors: medium Miles Straume (Ken Leung), anthropologist Charlotte Lewis (Rebecca Mader), and physicist Daniel Faraday (Jeremy Davies). The only main character to be involved in both storylines is John Locke (Terry O'Quinn), who, at the end of the fourth season, leaves his fellow crash survivors to become the new leader of the Others. However, following the first jump through time, he rejoins the crash survivors and eventually leaves the island and dies, which prompts the other survivors who have left the island to return with his body. The character of Charlotte is written out in the fifth episode of the season, as well as Faraday in the fourteenth and overall one hundredth episode.

Those who previously received star billing in season four, but did not in season five include Claire Littleton (Emilie de Ravin), who followed an apparition of her deceased father into the forest and later appeared in Jacob's cabin and Michael Dawson (Harold Perrineau), who died when the freighter exploded. Emilie de Ravin returned as a regular cast member in season six. Furthermore, former main cast member Malcolm David Kelley, who portrays Walt Lloyd, Michael's son, makes guest appearances in the fifth season. Second season main cast member Michelle Rodriguez portrays the deceased Ana Lucia Cortez in one episode.

Several of the guest stars from past seasons reprise their roles in season five. Nestor Carbonell appears as the apparently ageless Richard Alpert in nine episodes; Cheech Marin returns as Hurley's father, David Reyes; François Chau portrays Dharma Initiative scientist Dr. Pierre Chang; Lance Reddick continues to appear as the mysterious Matthew Abaddon; Sonya Walger plays Desmond's wife, Penny Widmore; William Mapother portrays deceased Other Ethan Rom; Jeff Fahey returns as pilot Frank Lapidus; and L. Scott Caldwell and Sam Anderson continue to play married couple Rose Henderson and Bernard Nadler, respectively. Recurring guest stars Alan Dale and John Terry who play billionaire Charles Widmore and deceased Christian Shephard, respectively reprise their roles. The character of Danielle Rousseau is present in the fifth season as a younger version, played by Melissa Farman. Mira Furlan, who previously portrayed an older Rousseau, asked for her character to be written out of the series because she did not want to travel to Hawaii to film her scenes. Tania Raymonde returns as her daughter, Alex. Fionnula Flanagan also returns as Eloise Hawking. Patrick Fischler plays Phil, a member of the DHARMA Initiative. Brad William Henke portrays Bram, a survivor of Ajira Airways flight 316. Sterling Beaumon reprises his role of young Ben for four episodes in the second half of the season. Marsha Thomason also returns briefly as Naomi Dorrit. The final recurring character is Vincent, Walt's yellow lab. The producers stated that Vincent survives to the series' conclusion.

Several new recurring characters are introduced in the fifth season. Two characters introduced in the premiere are Lara, Dr. Chang's wife and Miles' mother, who is portrayed by Leslie Ishii, and Dan Norton, an attorney who is given the task of performing a maternity test on Kate and Aaron, portrayed by Tom Irwin. Another pair of recurring characters, Caesar played by Saïd Taghmaoui and Ilana, played by Zuleikha Robinson, are introduced in the sixth episode, "316". Ilana was upgraded to the main cast in the sixth season. Reiko Aylesworth guest-stars in three episodes as Amy, a member of the Dharma Initiative, a scientific group that did research on the island in the 1970s. Eric Lange portrays Radzinsky, a member of the Dharma Initiative, in seven episodes. Two new recurring characters appeared in the fifth-season finale: Jacob, the well-known and unseen leader of the Others, played by Mark Pellegrino, and his unnamed nemesis (nicknamed "Samuel" in the casting call), whom Ausiello likened to J. R. Ewing and is portrayed by Titus Welliver. Sean Whalen, who previously portrayed Neil Frogurt in the Lost: Missing Pieces mobisodes, reprised his role in the first two episodes of season five.

Reception
Season 5 received mostly positive critical reception. On Rotten Tomatoes, the season has an 90% approval rating, with average rating of 8.8/10, based on 21 reviews. The website's consensus reads, "Though it introduces yet more unanswered questions, Season 5 of Lost also moves quickly, covers more character development, and fleshes out its rich world further for hungry fans." Metacritic gave the season a score of 78 out of 100 based on 17 reviews, making it generally favorable. Season 5 continued Lost decline in ratings, with the two-hour season premiere being watched by 11.37 million American viewers; the lowest season premiere in the series' history. Overall, the entire season averaged 11.05 million viewers.

The season was also nominated for five Primetime Emmy Awards, including Outstanding Drama Series, Outstanding Writing for a Drama Series for Carlton Cuse and Damon Lindelof for the episode "The Incident", Outstanding Supporting Actor in a Drama Series for Michael Emerson, Outstanding Single Camera Picture Editing for a Drama Series, and Outstanding Sound Mixing for a Comedy or Drama Series (One Hour). The only winner among the nominees was Emerson, after being nominated for the same award two years previous. Emerson was later nominated at the 67th Golden Globe Awards for Best Performance by an Actor in a Supporting Role in a Series, Mini-Series or Motion Picture Made for Television.

Episodes

The number in the "No. overall" column refers to the episode's number within the overall series, whereas the number in the "No. in season" column refers to the episode's number within this particular season. "U.S. viewers (million)" refers to the number of Americans in millions who watched the episode as it was aired. "Lost: Destiny Calls", a clip-show recapping the first four seasons preceded the premiere. A second clip show, "Lost: The Story of the Oceanic 6", aired on April 22, 2009 (before the 14th episode of the season, which is the 100th episode of the whole series), and a third, "Lost: A Journey in Time", was aired before the finale on May 13, 2009.

Home media release
The DVD and Blu-ray box set of season 5 was released on December 8, 2009, in Region 1, on October 21, 2009, in Region 4, and on October 26, 2009, in Region 2. It includes all episodes in the season and bonus features including:

References

External links

List of Lost season 5 episodes at Lostpedia

Lost (TV series)
2009 American television seasons
 
Television series set in 1977
Television series set in 2007